John Spencer Jones (1924 – 11 March 2007) was a British chest physician. In 1945, while studying medicine at Guy's Hospital, he assisted at Bergen-Belsen concentration camp as a voluntary medical student. Here, he developed tuberculosis. He later authored a number of articles in medical journals including "Telling the right patient" in the British Medical Journal (1981), where he reported that 50% of people with terminal disease "want to know that this is so".

Selected publications
"Telling the right patient". British Medical Journal, Vol. 283, No. 6286 (25 July 1981), pp. 291–292.

References 

20th-century British medical doctors
London medical students who assisted at Belsen
1945 in medicine
1924 births
2007 deaths